The Copa Constitució 2008 was the 16th edition of the Andorran Cup, which is a football knockout competition.

Qualifying match
The match was played on 17 January 2008.

|}

First elimination round
The matches were played on 19 and 20 January 2008.

|}

Played on 21 January 2008:

|}

Second elimination round
The matches were played on 27 January 2008.

|}

Quarter finals
The matches were played on 6 and 10 February 2008.

|}

Semi finals
The matches were played on 18 May 2008.

|}

Final
The final was played on 24 May 2008.

|}

References
Andorra Cup 2007/2008 at rsssf.com

Copa Constitució seasons
Andorra
Copa